Vagococcus fluvialis is a species of bacteria. The type strain of V. fluvialis is NCDO 2497. It rarely causes human infection. The only genetically proven case of V. fluvialis endocarditis was detected in the Cochin, India.

References

Further reading

External links
LPSN

Type strain of Vagococcus fluvialis at BacDive -  the Bacterial Diversity Metadatabase

Lactobacillales
Bacteria described in 2009